Norberto Navarro Rodríguez (born September 20, 1970) is a Puerto Rican former Major League Baseball pinch hitter and shortstop who played for the New York Mets in their 1993 season.

Major League career
Navarro entered the majors on September 6, 1993 at the age of 22. He played in 12 games for the Mets that year and was used almost entirely as a pinch hitter (though he started two games at shortstop as well). In 17 at-bats, he collected one hit for a .059 batting average. He also collected an RBI and scored a run. He played his final game on October 3.

He did not commit an error in the field.

Minor league career
Navarro played in the minor leagues from 1988 to 1991 and from 1993 to 1994, spending his entire career in the Mets' system. In 552 games, he hit .286 with 543 hits, 141 stolen bases and 288 runs scored.

He showed some flashes of excellence throughout his career. For example, he hit .311 with 50 stolen bases for the Columbia Mets and Jackson Mets in 1990 and the following year, with the Williamsport Bills, he stole 42 bases. He also showed an excellent eye at the plate both years, as he walked 144 times combined, compared to only 120 strikeouts.

References

Living people
1970 births
New York Mets players
Puerto Rican baseball players
People from Río Piedras, Puerto Rico
Columbia Mets players
Gulf Coast Mets players
Jackson Mets players
Kingsport Mets players
Norfolk Tides players
Pittsfield Mets players
St. Lucie Mets players
Williamsport Bills players